Nothofagus alpina, also called rauli or raulí beech (in Mapuche language) is a species of plant in the Nothofagaceae family. A deciduous tree, it grows in Chile and Argentina, it reaches 50 m (160 ft) height and more than 2 meters (6.5 feet) in diameter. Its distribution goes from 35 to 42° South latitude. It is found on the Andes. It tolerates low temperatures and heavy winds. It has a straight and cylindrical trunk with grey bark. N. alpina was proposed to be renamed Lophozonia alpina in 2013.

Description 
Monoecious and leafy. Alternate leaves, petioles 3 to 12 mm long, oblong ovate to lanceolate ovate, with glands and hairs regularly distributed, undulate margins and softly serrated. Lamina 4 to 12 x 2,5 to 5 cm, pinnate veins, pilose and very notorious, mostly below the leaf, new borne green shoots pubescent with brown felt-like hairs.

Flowers little unisexual: male in clusters of 3 flowers, briefly pedicellate, numerous stamens, male flowers disposed in 3 inflorescences supported by a peduncle about 1 cm long.

Fruit made up by a cupule of 4 narrow valves, in its interior 2 to 3 little yellowish nuts 6 mm long, a little hairy, being the two lower triangular, tri-winged, and the flat internal, bi-winged.

Raulí wood is pinkish with brown-reddish color and has a very fine grain. It is relatively easy to work and of medium weight. It is used in furniture, barrels for very fine Chilean wines, doors, veneers, shingles and floors. It has been introduced as ornamental in Great Britain and it grows well in Western Scotland, where it gets the necessary rainfall for its good growth; minimum 750 mm (30 in). It is very promising as a forestry tree in Western Great Britain and regenerates easily after coppicing.

Frost hardiness study in Britain 
Provenance sources from different places from its natural environment were tested in cultivation at the Bush estate in Scotland. Seedlots of  Nothofagus alpina and Nothofagus obliqua were tested.  The results of the testing in relation to the sources were reported as:
 Ñuble in Chile.  This was the most equatorial source and these seedlots proved to be the most susceptible to frost.
 Neuquen in Argentina.  These seedlots, as well as those gathered from mature trees growing in Britain with origins from Malleco in Chile were the most hardy.  Overall, Nothofagus alpina performed better than Nothofagus obliqua.
Past temperature records for Britain suggest that seedlots run a high risk of suffering severe frost damage in all but mild coastal regions, and that spring and autumn frosts may be more damaging than winter frosts.

Experimental plantations established in Wales suffered severe damage during the 1981–1982 cold wave that swept through Britain.

Other locations 
At Nautesund in Norway where the extreme minimum annual temperature is -14 °C, combined with a south-facing exposure, good rainfall, and shelter from polar winds allow specimens of Rauli to grow.

Hybrids 
 Nothofagus alpina hybridises with Nothofagus obliqua to form the hybrid species Nothofagus × dodecaphleps.

References and external links 

Donoso, C. 2005. Árboles nativos de Chile. Guía de reconocimiento. Edición 4. Marisa Cuneo Ediciones, Valdivia, Chile. 136p.
Hoffmann, Adriana. 1998. Flora Silvestre de Chile, Zona Central. Edición 4. Fundación Claudio Gay, Santiago. 254p.
Rodríguez, R. &  Quezada, M. 2003. Fagaceae. En C. Marticorena y R. Rodríguez [eds.], Flora de Chile Vol. 2(2), pp 64–76. Universidad de Concepción, Concepción.
Bean. W. 1981 Trees and Shrubs Hardy in Great Britain. Vol 1 - 4 and Supplement. Murray.

External links
Rauli in Encyclopedia of Chilean Flora
Rauli in Chile bosque
Rauli, Description and images from Chile Flora

Nothofagaceae
Flora of Argentina
Flora of central Chile
Trees of Chile
Trees of Argentina
Trees of mild maritime climate
Near threatened flora of South America
Garden plants of South America
Ornamental trees
Taxonomy articles created by Polbot
Flora of the Valdivian temperate rainforest